Holt Ministry may refer to:

 First Holt Ministry
 Second Holt Ministry